Evangelos "Vangelis" Mantzaris (Greek: Ευάγγελος "Βαγγέλης" Μάντζαρης, born April 16, 1990) is a Greek professional basketball player who last played for Ionikos Nikaias of the Greek Basket League. He is a 1.96 m (6'5") tall point guard and shooting guard. He also represents the senior National Basketball Team of Greece internationally.

Professional career

Peristeri
Mantzaris began his professional career in the Greek 2nd Division with Peristeri, the team of his hometown. With Peristeri, he won the Greek 2nd Division championship in 2009.

Olympiacos
On September 5, 2011, Mantzaris signed a four-year deal with the top-tier level Greek Basket League and EuroLeague club Olympiacos Piraeus. He won both the EuroLeague and Greek League championships in 2012, being a useful tool for the team of coach Dušan Ivković, especially due to his defensive ability.

In January 2013, Mantzaris suffered a season-ending knee injury, after rupturing the anterior cruciate ligament in his right knee during a Greek Basket League derby against PAOK Thessaloniki at PAOK Sports Arena. Despite suffering the knee injury, he remained close to his teammates both in and out of the locker room in order to support them, as they won the EuroLeague 2012–13 season championship. Mantzaris returned to action seven months later and in early October of the same year won the FIBA Intercontinental Cup against Pinheiros at Ginásio José Corrêa, Brazil. In the two finals, he averaged 9 points, 4.5 rebounds and 3 assists, helping Olympiacos to celebrate the title. On 29 July 2014, Mantzaris extended his contract with Olympiacos through 2017.

Mantzaris won the Greek League 2014–15 season and Greek League 2015–16 season national domestic championships with Olympiacos, under the instructions of former Houston Rockets assistant coach, Ioannis Sfairopoulos, being the starting point guard of his team in both seasons. He also competed in the 2015 EuroLeague Finals versus Real Madrid, in Madrid, and in the 2017 EuroLeague Finals against Fenerbahçe, in Istanbul, however without earning the trophy.

On June 16, 2017, Mantzaris signed a three-year contract extension with Olympiacos.

UNICS Kazan
On July 20, 2019, Mantzaris was released from Olympiacos, after eight seasons, and signed with UNICS Kazan of the VTB United League and the EuroCup, playing under fellow Greek coach Dimitrios Priftis. He left in December, returning to Greece.

Promitheas Patras
On December 30, 2019, Mantzaris returned to Greece and signed with EuroCup side Promitheas Patras. He averaged 10.5 points, 2.2 rebounds, 5.3 assists and 1.8 steals per game. On October 8, 2020, Mantzaris re-signed with the team.

Return to Peristeri
On December 17, 2020, Mantzaris officially returned to Peristeri after nine years.

Stal Ostrów Wielkopolski
On August 6, 2021, he has signed with Stal Ostrów Wielkopolski of the Polish Basketball League. In four games he averaged five points, five assists, 3.3 rebounds, and 1.3 steals per game.

Hapoel Eilat
On October 4, 2021, Mantzaris signed with Hapoel Eilat of the Israeli Basketball Premier League.

PAOK
On November 11, 2021, Mantzaris signed with PAOK of the Greek Basket League.

Ionikos Nikaias
On September 22, 2022, Mantzaris moved to Ionikos Nikaias.

National team career

Greek junior national team
As a member of the junior national basketball teams of Greece, Mantzaris won the gold medal at the 2008 FIBA Europe Under-18 Championship and the silver medal at the 2009 FIBA Under-19 World Cup. Mantzaris also won the gold medal at the 2009 FIBA Europe Under-20 Championship, and the silver medal at the 2010 FIBA Europe Under-20 Championship, with Greece's junior national teams.

Greek senior national team
Mantzaris became a member of the senior men's Greek national basketball team in 2011. He was a member of Greece's senior national teams that played at the 2012 FIBA World Olympic Qualifying Tournament, the 2014 FIBA World Cup, and the EuroBasket 2015. He also played at the 2016 Turin FIBA World Olympic Qualifying Tournament, and at the EuroBasket 2017.

He also represented Greece at the 2019 FIBA World Cup qualification.

Career statistics

EuroLeague

|-
| style="text-align:left;background:#AFE6BA;"| 2011–12†
| style="text-align:left;" rowspan=7| Olympiacos
| 18 || 14 || 14.1 || .212 || .364 || .385 || 2.3 || .9 || .6 || .0 || 1.9 || 2.8
|-
| style="text-align:left;background:#AFE6BA;"| 2012–13†
| 15 || 15 || 20.9 || .419 || .438 || .750 || 2.5 || 2.3 || .9 || .1 || 3.5 || 4.9
|-
| style="text-align:left;"| 2013–14
| 29 || 25 || 23.6 || .387 || .364 || .607 || 3.4 || 3.2 || .7 || .0 || 4.5 || 6.9
|-
| style="text-align:left;"| 2014–15
| 29 || 29 || 22.4 || .433 || .365 || .609 || 2.2 || 2.5 || .6 || .0 || 5.1 || 5.6
|-
| style="text-align:left;"| 2015–16
| 24 || 24 || 22.9 || .405 || .447 || .719 || 2.8 || 2.0 || .7 || .0 || 6.5 || 6.5
|-
| style="text-align:left;"| 2016–17
| 37 || 37 || 23.7 || .348 || .364 || .696 || 2.8 || 2.4 || .7 || .0 || 5.8 || 4.9
|-
| style="text-align:left;"| 2017–18
| 31 || 12 || 19.7 || .322 || .275 || .829 || 2.1 || 2.0 || .7 || .0 || 4.4 || 4.1
|- class="sortbottom"
| align="center" colspan="2"| Career
| 183 || 156 || 21.5 || .376 || .365 || .683 || 2.6 || 2.3 || .7 || .0 || 4.8 || 5.2

Awards and accomplishments

Pro career

Peristeri
Greek 2nd Division Champion: (2009)
Olympiacos
2× EuroLeague Champion: (2012, 2013)
3× Greek League Champion: (2012, 2015, 2016)
FIBA Intercontinental Cup Champion: (2013)

Greek junior national team
2008 Albert Schweitzer Tournament: 
2008 FIBA Europe Under-18 Championship: 
2009 FIBA Under-19 World Cup: 
2009 FIBA Europe Under-20 Championship: 
2010 FIBA Europe Under-20 Championship:

Individual
 2× Greek League All-Star: (2014, 2020)
2× All-Greek League Defensive Team (2012, 2017)
 4× Eurobasket.com's  All-Greek League Defensive Team: (2014–2017)

Personal life
Mantzaris is a resident of Peristeri, which is a west suburb of Athens, and the biggest municipality of the Attica Region. His brother, Antonis Mantzaris, is also a professional basketball player. They were teammates from 2007, until the summer of 2011, with Peristeri Basketball Club. In 2009, they won the Greek 2nd Division championship with the club. He owns a café in the area, as well.

References

External links
Vangelis Mantzaris at draftexpress.com
Vangelis Mantzaris at esake.gr 
Vangelis Mantzaris at basket.gr 
Vangelis Mantzaris at eurobasket.com
Vangelis Mantzaris at euroleague.net
Vangelis Mantzaris at fiba.com

1990 births
Living people
2014 FIBA Basketball World Cup players
2019 FIBA Basketball World Cup players
BC UNICS players
Greek Basket League players
Greek men's basketball players
Greek expatriate basketball people in Israel
Greek expatriate basketball people in Poland
Hapoel Eilat basketball players
Ionikos Nikaias B.C. players
Olympiacos B.C. players
P.A.O.K. BC players
Peristeri B.C. players
Promitheas Patras B.C. players
Point guards
Shooting guards
Basketball players from Athens
Stal Ostrów Wielkopolski players